Da Bidness 2 is a collaboration album by American rappers The Boy Boy Young Mess, Keak da Sneak & PSD, released in January 2011 via Fatt City Incorporated & SMC Recordings. The sequel to their 2007 album Da Bidness, it features guest appearances from Jagged Edge, Baby Bash & E-40, among others. It charted on the Heatseekers Pacific chart.

Track listing

References

2011 albums
Messy Marv albums
Keak da Sneak albums
PSD (rapper) albums
SMC Recordings albums
Sequel albums
Collaborative albums